Vakarel is a village,  away from Sofia, the capital of Bulgaria. 

Population: 1984 people. It is situated in the Sredna Gora mountains, within Ihtiman Municipality. The village is an important transport knot along the Sofia - Plovdiv railway route. The Trakiya motorway runs near Vakarel. Vakarel is 822 meters above sea level. 
Near Vakarel is the Vakarelian Monastery 'Saint Petka'. The monastery is relatively new, established in the 20th century. Its yearly celebration is on 14 October. 
Residential areas are also around Vakarel.

Vakarel's name is of Aromanian (Balkan Latin) origin, from the word vacarel, "cattleshed, cowshed" or with the Aromanian diminutive suffix –el, "young cowherd", cf. Romanian văcar, "cowboy, neatherd".

Gallery

Honour
Vakarel Saddle on Smith Island, South Shetland Islands is named after Vakarel.

References

Villages in Sofia Province